Alpha Cephei (α Cephei, abbreviated Alpha Cep, α Cep), officially named Alderamin , is a second magnitude star in the constellation of Cepheus near the northern pole. The star is relatively close to Earth at 49 light years (ly).

Nomenclature

α Cephei (Latinised to Alpha Cephei) is the star's Bayer designation. It has a Flamsteed designation of 5 Cephei.

It bore the traditional name Alderamin, a contraction of the Arabic phrase الذراع اليمين al-dhirā‘ al-yamīn, meaning "the right arm". In 2016, the International Astronomical Union organized a Working Group on Star Names (WGSN) to catalog and standardize proper names for stars. The WGSN's first bulletin of July 2016 included a table of the first two batches of names approved by the WGSN; which included Alderamin for this star.

Visibility 
With a declination in excess of 62 degrees north, Alpha Cephei never rises south of −27° latitude, which means for much of South America, Australia, South Africa, and all of New Zealand, the star stays below the horizon. The star is circumpolar throughout all of Europe, northern Asia, Canada, and American cities as far south as San Diego. Since Alpha Cephei has an apparent magnitude of about 2.5, the star is the brightest in the constellation and is easily observable to the naked eye, even in light-polluted cities.

Pole star 
Alpha Cephei is located near the precessional path traced across the celestial sphere by the Earth's North pole. That means that it periodically comes within 3° of being a pole star, a title currently held by Polaris. Alpha Cephei will next be the North Star in about the year 7500 AD. The north pole of Mars points to the midpoint of the line connecting the star and Deneb.

Properties 

Alderamin is a white class A star, evolving off the main sequence into a subgiant, probably on its way to becoming a red giant as its hydrogen supply runs low. In 2007, the star's apparent magnitude was recalibrated at 2.5141 along with an updated parallax of 66.50 ± 0.11 mas yielding a distance of 15 parsecs or approximately 49 light years from Earth.

Given a surface temperature of 7,740 Kelvin, stellar models yield a total luminosity for the star of about 17 times the luminosity of the Sun. Alderamin has a radius of 2.3 times the Sun's radius and boasting a mass that is 1.74 that of the Sun. Like other stars in its class, it is slightly variable with a range in brightness of 0.06 magnitude, and is listed as a Delta Scuti variable.

Alderamin has a very high rotation speed of at least 246 km/s, completing one complete revolution in less than 12 hours, with such a rapid turnover appearing to inhibit the differentiation of chemical elements usually seen in such stars. By comparison, the Sun takes almost a month to turn on its axis. Alpha Cephei is also known to emit an amount of X radiation similar to the Sun, which along with other indicators suggests the existence of considerable magnetic activity—something unexpected (though not at all unusual) for a fast rotator.

Etymology and cultural significance 
This star, along with Beta Cephei (Alfirk) and Eta Cephei (Alkidr) were al-Kawākib al-Firq (الكواكب الفرق), meaning "the Stars of the Flock" by Ulug Beg.

Namesakes
USS Alderamin (AK-116) was a United States Navy Crater class cargo ship named after the star.

See also
 List of nearest bright stars
 Dwarf star

References

External links 
 
NASA's: History of Precession
Crystallinks: Precession of the Equinoxes

Cephei, Alpha
Cepheus (constellation)
A-type subgiants
Northern pole stars
Alderamin
Castor Moving Group
Cephei, 05
203280
8162
BD+61 2111
105199
Suspected variables
Delta Scuti variables
0826